Lambi Assembly constituency (Sl. No.: 83) is a Punjab Legislative Assembly constituency in Sri Muktsar Sahib district, Punjab state, India. A voter-verified paper audit trail was used in Lambi in the 2017 Assembly polls. It is part of the Bathinda Lok Sabha constituency, which is represented by Harsimrat Kaur Badal. The total number of voters in this constituency is 155,556 and there are 168 polling stations.

Parkash Singh Badal has been a record four times chief minister of Punjab. He has won five consecutive times from Lambi constituency from 1997 to 2017.

List of MLAs 
Members of Punjab Legislative Assembly Lambi.

Election results

2022

2017

2012

See also 
Punjab Legislative Assembly
 List of constituencies of the Punjab Legislative Assembly
 Sri Muktsar Sahib district

References

External links
 

Assembly constituencies of Punjab, India
Sri Muktsar Sahib district